

Barnett Rotorcraft is an American aircraft manufacturer established by Jerry Barnett in Olivehurst, California in 1962 to market gyrocopters for homebuilding. The firm's most significant design is the Barnett J4B, available in single- and two-seat versions.

References
 
 aerofiles.com
 Barnett Rotorcraft company website

Aircraft manufacturers of the United States
Manufacturing companies based in California
Companies based in Yuba County, California
Vehicle manufacturing companies established in 1962
1962 establishments in California